Eidinemacheilus smithi, also known as the Zagroz blind loach, is a species of loach in the family Nemacheilidae. This cavefish is endemic to an aquifer in the Karun River drainage in the Zagros Mountains of Iran.

It is named after British explorer Anthony Smith, who collected the type specimens.

There are three other known cavefish species in Iran: Garra lorestanensis, G. tashanensis and G. typhlops.

References

Cave fish
Nemacheilidae
Fauna of Iran
Fish described in 1976
Endemic fauna of Iran
Taxonomy articles created by Polbot